The 1944 Ball State Cardinals football team was an American football team that represented Ball State Teachers College (later renamed Ball State University) in the Indiana Intercollegiate Conference during the 1944 college football season. In its ninth season under head coach John Magnabosco, the team compiled a 2–2 record. 

Ball State resumed college football in October 1944 after a wartime hiatus that began at the end of the 1942 season. Due to a manpower shortage, coach Magnabosco formed his 1944 team out of students, "most of whom never engaged in the gridiron sport." To draw fans back to the game, the school did not charge for admission to its football games.

Dick Van Landingham proved to be the star of the team's backfield, playing variously at the quarterback and halfback positions.

The team played its home games at Ball State Field, sometimes referred to as Cardinal Field, in Muncie, Indiana.

Schedule

References

Ball State
Ball State Cardinals football seasons
Ball State Cardinals football